Aleksandr Aleksandrovich Bushkov (born April 5, 1956) is a best-selling Russian author who has written books in the genres of science fiction, crime fiction, popular history and non-fiction. In his belletristic, published in literary and popular journals, Bushkov has been critical of conventional academic approaches in fields such as history and evolutionary biology. As indicated on the personal webpage of the author, his total number of volumes published (all works and all editions) exceeds 17 million.

Biography
Aleksandr Bushkov was born in the ancient city of Minusinsk, which is located Krasnoyarsk Krai, Siberia, Russia, on April 5, 1956.  His ancestors had Baltic origins and originated in Lithuania.  He struggled to learn in a conventional classroom setting, and he has stated in interviews that he was a poor student, often acting up. Bushkov would never receive an undergraduate degree and was largely self-taught, through his voracious appetite for reading.  His personal library has grown to such immense size over the years that he was forced to add a second storey to his dacha in order to accommodate it. Prior to the death in a helicopter crash of the former governor of Krasnoyarsk Krai, Alexander Lebed in 2002, Bushkov had held office as an advisor and aide to the governor. After 2002, information about Bushkov has become increasingly scarce. The author's website suggests that he is at present living in isolation in a dacha on the distant outskirts of Minusinsk, which lacks modern means of communication, and so, he is essentially a recluse.  Bushkov shares his home with several hamsters and a dog.

References

External links
 Официальный сайт писателя
 Фанклуб А. А. Бушкова «СВАРОГ»
 http://www.fantasyclub.ru/critics/bushkov.html
 Елисеев Г. А. Историк России, которого не было — критика историком книги «Россия, которой не было: загадки, версии, гипотезы»
 Мазурин Как «нагнуть» историю по-бушковски — критика бушковского видения декабризма
 Биография Бушкова А. А. книги в библиотеке InetLib.Ru

1956 births
Living people
People from Minusinsk
Russian science fiction writers
Russian crime fiction writers
Pseudohistorians